Tetracis australis is a moth of the family Geometridae. It is found from the coastal southern regions of the U.S. state of California from Monterey County south to Los Encinas, San Pedro Martir, Baja California, Mexico, at altitudes from near sea level to 2,135 meters.

The length of the forewings 19–23 mm. Adults are on wing from March to late June.

The larvae probably feed on Quercus and Populus species.

External links
Revision of the North American genera Tetracis Guenée and synonymization of Synaxis Hulst with descriptions of three new species (Lepidoptera: Geometridae: Ennominae)

Tetracis
Moths described in 2009